Secretos del paraíso is a Colombian telenovela produced by Vista Productions for RCN Televisión. It is an adaptation of the telenovela produced in 1993, La maldición del paraíso. The series debuted first in MundoFox on July 22, 2013, while in Colombia it was released on November 10, 2014 and its last episode was aired on August 21, 2015. The series had a total of 182 episodes in Colombia.

The series is starring Juan Pablo Espinosa as Cristóbal, Natalia Durán as Victoria and Iván López as Alejandro.

Plot 
Victoria Márquez is a beautiful, successful and sophisticated woman. Recognized in the world of fashion for being the owner of a prestigious modeling agency. Victoria is about to marry Alejandro Soler, whom she believes to be deeply in love. Her marriage is also the consolidation of the partnership between her mother and her boyfriend, owners of the advertising agency Santana & Soler, one of the most important in Latin America.

Cast

Main 
 Juan Pablo Espinosa as Cristóbal Soler
 Natalia Durán as Victoria Márquez
 Iván López as Alejandro Soler
 Jorge Cao as Guillermo
 Silvia De Dios as Eugenia
 Patricia Tamayo as Helena de Soler
 Gloria Gómez as Fernanda Soler
 Marcela Gallego as Esmeralda
 Ernesto Benjumea as Ricardo
 Alina Lozano as Mercedes
 Carlos Hurtado as Roberto
 Linda Baldrich as Lucía
 Juan Fernando Sánchez as Federico
 Carlos Torres as Julián Márquez 
 María José Martínez as María del Pilar “Mapi” Cortéz Espinosa 
 Mateo Rueda as Daniel
 Susana Rojas as Marisol
 Lisbeth Cepeda as Azucena

Recurring 
 Estefanía Borge as Mariana
 Jhao Salinas as Marcelo
 Germán Quintero as Manuel
 Liz Bazurto as Sonia
 Diana Wiswell as Rubí

Ratings

References

External links 
 

Colombian telenovelas
MundoMax original programming
RCN Televisión telenovelas
2013 telenovelas
2014 Colombian television series debuts
2015 Colombian television series endings
Spanish-language telenovelas
2010s Colombian television series
Television shows set in Bogotá
Television shows set in New York City